Truppach is a district of Mistelgau, a municipality in the district of Bayreuth in Bavaria in Germany.

References

 	

Bayreuth (district)